Anthony Ray Denman (born October 30, 1979) is a former American football linebacker who played two seasons in the National Football League (NFL) with the Cleveland Browns and Buffalo Bills. He was drafted by the Jacksonville Jaguars in the seventh round of the 2003 NFL Draft. He played college football at the University of Notre Dame.

Early years
Denman earned four letters playing high school football at Rusk High School. He spent time at running back, quarterback, linebacker, defensive line and fullback during high school. He garnered all-state allocates his senior season in 1996 after rushing for 1,250 yards and 12 touchdowns on offense while recording 85 tackles and one sack on defense. Denman was also team captain as a senior. He earned first-team all-East Texas and all-district honors his junior and senior seasons. He rushed for 1,428 yards and 20 touchdowns as junior in 1995. Denman also earned three letters in track and field.

College career
Denman played for the Notre Dame Fighting Irish from 1997 to 2000, recording career totals of 207 tackles and nine sacks. He earned Associated Press Second-team All-American honors in 2000. He was also Notre Dame MVP and a team captain his senior year in 2000.

Professional career

Jacksonville Jaguars
Denman was selected by the Jacksonville Jaguars of the NFL with the 213th pick in the 2001 NFL Draft and signed with the team on June 7, 2001. He was released by the Jaguars on August 27, 2001.

Cleveland Browns
Denman signed with the Cleveland Browns of the NFL on August 28, 2001 and was released by the team on September 2. He was signed to the Browns' practice squad on September 7 and promoted to the active roster on September 19. He played in eleven games for the Browns during the 2001 season. Denman was released by the Browns on September 1, 2002.

Buffalo Bills
Denman was signed by the Buffalo Bills of the NFL on September 3, 2002. He played in sixteen games for the Bills in 2002.

References

External links
Just Sports Stats
College stats

Living people
1979 births
Players of American football from Texas
American football linebackers
African-American players of American football
Notre Dame Fighting Irish football players
Jacksonville Jaguars players
Cleveland Browns players
Buffalo Bills players
People from Lufkin, Texas
21st-century African-American sportspeople
20th-century African-American sportspeople